The Florida Gulf Coast Eagles college basketball team competes in the National Collegiate Athletic Association (NCAA) Division I, representing the Florida Gulf Coast University in the ASUN Conference. The Eagles play their home games at the Alico Arena in Fort Myers, Florida.

Seasons

References

Florida Gulf Coast
Florida Gulf Coast Eagles basketball seasons